Bangladesh Medical College (BMC), established in 1986, is the oldest private medical college as well as the oldest private institute for tertiary education in Bangladesh. The college is located in Dhanmondi, Dhaka. It is affiliated with University of Dhaka as a constituent college.

It offers a five-year course of study leading to a Bachelor of Medicine, Bachelor of Surgery (MBBS) degree. A one-year internship after graduation is compulsory for all graduates. The degree is recognised by the 
Bangladesh Medical and Dental Council.

The college is attached to 500-bed Bangladesh Medical College Hospital.

History
Bangladesh Medical College is the oldest private medical school in Bangladesh. It was established in 1986 by Bangladesh Medical Studies and Research Institute (BMSRI), a non-profit organisation that runs the college and associated hospital. The University of Dhaka granted affiliation in 1988.

Campus
The college is located in Dhanmondi Thana, Dhaka. The college's six-story academic building is attached to a six-story, 500-bed teaching hospital, Bangladesh Medical College Hospital.

Organisation and administration
The college is affiliated with Dhaka University as a constituent college. The founder chairman of the college was late Prof. Mohammad Yusuf Ali. The founder principal was late Dr A.H.M Samsul Haque.

Academics
The college offers a five-year course of study, approved by the Bangladesh Medical and Dental Council (BMDC), leading to a Bachelor of Medicine, Bachelor of Surgery (MBBS) degree from Dhaka University. After passing the final professional examination, there is a compulsory one-year internship. The internship is a prerequisite for obtaining registration from the BMDC to practice medicine. In October 2014, the Ministry of Health and Family Welfare capped admission and tuition fees at private medical colleges at 1,990,000 Bangladeshi taka (US$25,750 as of 2014) total for their five-year courses.

Admission for Bangladeshis to the MBBS programme at all medical colleges in Bangladesh (government and private) is conducted centrally by the Directorate General of Health Services (DGHS). It administers a written multiple choice question exam simultaneously throughout the country. Candidates are admitted based primarily on their score on this test, although grades at Secondary School Certificate (SSC) and Higher Secondary School Certificate (HSC) level also play a part. Seats are reserved, according to quotas set by the Directorate General of Health Services (DGHS), for children of Freedom Fighters and for students from underprivileged backgrounds. Currently, the college is allowed to admit 120 students annually.

Journal
Bangladesh Medical College Journal is the official journal of the college. It is a peer-reviewed, open access journal, published semi-annually. It accepts original research articles, review articles on topics of current interest, and interesting case reports.

See also
 List of medical colleges in Bangladesh

References

Medical colleges in Bangladesh
Universities and colleges in Dhaka
Hospitals in Dhaka
Educational institutions established in 1986
1986 establishments in Bangladesh